Salammoniac, also sal ammoniac or salmiac, is a rare naturally occurring mineral composed of ammonium chloride, NH4Cl. It forms colorless, white, or yellow-brown crystals in the isometric-hexoctahedral class. It has very poor cleavage and is brittle to conchoidal fracture. It is quite soft, with a Mohs hardness of 1.5 to 2, and it has a low specific gravity of 1.5. It is water-soluble. Sal ammoniac is also the archaic name for the chemical compound ammonium chloride. 

Pliny, in Book XXXI of his Natural History, refers to a salt produced in the Roman province of Cyrenaica named hammoniacum, so called because of its proximity to the nearby Temple of Jupiter Amun (Greek Ἄμμων Ammon). However, the description Pliny gives of the salt does not conform to the properties of ammonium chloride. According to Herbert Hoover's commentary in his English translation of Georgius Agricola's De re metallica, it is likely to have been common sea salt. In any case, that salt ultimately gave ammonia and ammonium compounds their name.

The first attested reference to sal ammoniac as ammonium chloride is in the Pseudo-Geber work De inventione veritatis, where a preparation of sal ammoniac is given in the chapter De Salis armoniaci præparatione, salis armoniaci being a common name in the Middle Ages for sal ammoniac.

It typically forms as encrustations formed by sublimation around volcanic vents and is found around volcanic fumaroles, guano deposits and burning coal seams. Associated minerals include sodium alum, native sulfur and other fumarole minerals. Notable occurrences include Tajikistan; Mount Vesuvius, Italy; and Parícutin, Michoacan, Mexico.

Uses

It is commonly used to clean the soldering iron in the soldering of stained-glass windows.

Metal refining 
In jewellery-making and the refining of precious metals, potassium carbonate is added to gold and silver in a borax-coated crucible to purify iron or steel filings that may have contaminated the scrap. It is then air-cooled and remelted with a one-to-one mixture of powdered charcoal and sal ammoniac to yield a sturdy ingot of the respective metal or alloy in the case of sterling silver (7.5% copper) or karated gold.

Food 
Sal ammoniac has also been used in the past in bakery products to give cookies or biscuits their crisp texture, but the application of food grade baking ammonia (ammonium carbonate or (NH4)2CO3) is generally being substituted with the creation of modern baking powder or baking soda (sodium bicarbonate).

Sal ammoniac is used in salmiac liquorice, for instance salty liquorice or salmiak pastilles.

Dyeing 
In addition, the mineral or, better, its synthetic counterpart, also serves for the production of cooling baths as well as in dyeing and leather tanning.

Sal ammoniac (ammonium chloride) was the electrolyte in Leclanché cells, a forerunner of the dry battery; a carbon rod and a zinc rod or cylinder formed the electrodes.

Medicine 
It was also brought into pharmacopeias by Islamic physicians for medicinal purposes.

References

External links
 
 Mineral galleries

Ammonium minerals
Cubic minerals
Minerals in space group 221
Halide minerals